William Thomas Root (born 5 August 1992) is an English cricketer who plays for Glamorgan. Primarily a left-handed batsman, he also bowls right-arm off break. He is the brother of former England Test Captain Joe Root.

Early life
Root is the youngest son of Helen and Matt Root and grew up in Dore, Sheffield. He is the younger brother of Yorkshire and former England Test captain Joe Root. He attended King Ecgbert School in Sheffield.

Root and his brother played under11's cricket for Rotherham Town CC, and then like their father joined Sheffield Collegiate CC in Abbeydale Park, Sheffield. Former Yorkshire batsman and England captain Michael Vaughan also learnt his trade at Collegiate and was a source of inspiration for both Root brothers. Both brothers support Sheffield United F.C.

Cricket career
Root made his List A debut for Nottinghamshire in the 2017 Royal London One-Day Cup on 27 April 2017. He once appeared as a substitute fielder for the England cricket team. Opportunities at Nottinghamshire were limited for Root, however he did top the club averages in T20 cricket in the 2017 season, as well as making a crucial century in the final Championship game of the season at Hove, coming in at 55–4 to help force a vital draw.

Glamorgan
At the end of the 2018 season Root left Nottinghamshire to join Glamorgan on a two-year contract. Root made his County Championship debut for Glamorgan against Northamptonshire in April 2019, scoring 126 in the first innings. In May 2019, Root was suspended from bowling by the England and Wales Cricket Board (ECB) due to a suspect action. On August 23, 2019, Root was cleared to bowl again. In June 2019, Root scored his maiden first-class double hundred in a championship game against Northants, posting 229 in the first innings. Root ended his first season at Glamorgan with 768 runs in the County Championship and 386 runs at an average of 64.33 in the Royal London One Day Cup, making him the club's highest scorer in the competition.

During the shortened 2020 season, Root completed a 5th first-class century, making 118 against Worcestershire.

The 2021 season began with Root facing older brother Joe in a first-class game for the first time ever as Glamorgan opened their season away to Yorkshire. Fittingly, in the second innings, Root pushed a ball from his brother into the leg side for two to reach his 6th first-class hundred.

References

External links
 

1992 births
Living people
English cricketers
Cricketers from Sheffield
Nottinghamshire cricketers
Leeds/Bradford MCCU cricketers
Glamorgan cricketers
Suffolk cricketers
English cricketers of the 21st century